Beau Gallagher (born 12 September 1977) is a Samoan former professional rugby league footballer who played in the 1990s and 2000s. He represented Samoa at the 2000 World Cup.

Playing career
Gallagher played three first grade games for the North Sydney Bears in 1999.

In 2000 he moved to the Wests Tigers but did not play in a first grade match. He was named in the Samoan squad for the World Cup but did not play in a match at the tournament.

In 2010 he played for Tapuae in the Gisborne Tairawhiti competition.

References

Living people
Samoan rugby league players
Samoa national rugby league team players
1977 births
Rugby league in the Gisborne-East Coast district
North Sydney Bears players
Samoan expatriate rugby league players
Expatriate rugby league players in New Zealand
Expatriate rugby league players in Australia
Samoan expatriate sportspeople in New Zealand
Samoan expatriate sportspeople in Australia
Rugby league props